The New Zealand Bar Association (NZBA) is a voluntary association of lawyers in New Zealand who practise at the independent bar as barristers and King's Counsel.

The NZBA is governed by an elected council headed by a president. James Farmer QC was president from 1991 to 1995 and again from 2004 to 2008. For 2020/2021, the president was Paul Radich QC. For 2021–2023, the president is Maria Dew KC.

See also

 New Zealand Law Society

References

Bar associations
Bar Association, New Zealand
Year of establishment missing